Kensington Church Street is a shopping street in Kensington, London, England, designated the A4204, and traditionally known for its art and antiques shops.

Buildings at the southern end date back to the early 1700s. It is named after Kensington's original church of St Mary Abbots. The south part was formerly called Church Lane, and the north part, Silver Street. Until 1864 there was a toll gate at Campden Street.

The street runs north to south from Notting Hill Gate to Kensington High Street. There are several Grade II listed Georgian and Victorian buildings.

Time Out calls it "eccentrically posh".

Bombing

On the night of the 29th August 1975, Joseph O'Connell and Eddie Butler, members of the IRA's Balcombe Street Gang placed a bomb in the doorway of a shoe shop. The bomb later exploded, killing  Roger Goad, an explosives officer with the Metropolitan Police who was attempting to defuse it.

Notable residents

The composer Muzio Clementi lived at Number 128 from 1820 to 1823, and is commemorated with a blue plaque.

In fiction

The street is mentioned several times in The Napoleon of Notting Hill by G. K. Chesterton.

References

External links

Kensington
Shopping streets in London
Streets in the Royal Borough of Kensington and Chelsea
Odonyms referring to a building
Odonyms referring to religion